Brigid Lyons Thornton (13 May 1896 – 15 November 1987) was a member of Cumann na mBan, an officer in the Irish Free State Army and a physician. Thornton was a rebellious character whom from a young age was involved in a Nationalist movement. Her first small involvement was selling badges and flags at the O'Donovan Rossa funeral.

Personal life
Brigid Lyons Thornton was born in Northyard Scramogue, County Roscommon on 13 May 1896. She was the daughter of farmer and Fenian Patrick Lyons and Margaret McGuinness.
At a young age, Brigid moved to Longford to live with her uncle Frank McGuinness and his wife Kate, who paid for her secondary school education.  McGuinness is credited for Thornton's keen interest in politics and Irish history. In November 1934 Frank McGuinness died, having been a senator for five years and a renowned figure for his involvement in Irish history. Brigid Lyons Thornton was a medical student and a member of Cumman na mBan who was involved with the Irish Volunteers during 1916.  She was arrested during the Easter Rising and interned in Kilmainham Gaol along with other members of the Irish Volunteers.

Revolutionary
She graduated from medical school, Galway in 1922 being the youngest medical student there. She became the only commissioned female officer ever in the new Irish Free State Army.  She and Edward Thornton met when Brigid became ill with tuberculosis and was sent to Switzerland with other officers who had a similar condition.  During this time Thornton learned how to treat Tuberculosis while she was a patient.  This would be a significant advantage in later years.  She took her diploma in public health in 1927 and then entered the public health service.  She began in the public health service, County Kildare, later moving to County Cork until she finally ended up in Dublin where she worked until retirement.  Brigid Thornton helped to treat many infectious diseases.

Marriage
Thornton married captain Edward Thornton on 10 October 1925, in Dublin, at the Chapel of St Kevin in the Pro Cathedral.  The ceremony was a quiet reunion of family and friends. Her husband returned to Switzerland to heal from TB and was later released and cured. He became a lawyer.  Thornton attended the National University in 1947 and finished a postgraduate degree in Public Health.  Thornton was very passionate about her work in the public health system in Ireland, she resided permanently on home ground; meanwhile her husband resided in Switzerland for most of the winter months, he worked as a lawyer and their relationship was maintained through letter writing and yearly visits form Captain Thornton to Ireland. They are buried alongside each other in Toomore Cemetery.

1916 Easter Rising
Brigid returns to Longford when she hears the news of The 1916 Easter Rising. Her uncle Joe McGuinness was serving in the Four Courts along with Patrick Pearse, James Connolly and Michael Collins. Brigid decides to join with Uncle Frank and the volunteers he had gathered in Dublin for the week.  Their car was believed to be rejected to enter the Four Courts and by some means the crew was able to pass the barricade, and Brigid along with Cumann na mBan provided food and took care of the wounded rebels. She acted as a nurse to the First Battalion of volunteers who had taken possession of the Four Courts and adjoining streets.
After the surrender, she was put in jail in Kilmainham with her comrades and during the imprisonment, she heard that 14 of her idols were shot. After her release from the jail, she returned to continue studying medicine in Galway.

Revolutionary activities 
The involvement of Thornton in female activist activities in the late ninetieth century was a feat in itself as politics, religion and education were a conservative male-dominated preserve.  Patriotism found her involved in Sinn Féin and Cumann na mBan.  Women were limited by their male counterparts in the scope of their revolutionary activities.  In spite of this Thornton contributed as a rebel, soldier and commissioned medical officer.  In 1917 she set up a group of Cumann na mBan in Galway.  Despite her revolutionary activities as a dispatch carrier and involvement in the Easter Rising in 1916, which subsequently saw her imprisonment, Thornton qualified in 1922 at the rank of First Officer.  Later she was commissioned by Michael Collins to become the first and only woman to be accepted as a female officer in the Free State Army.  She was part of the medical services that formed the corps, when it was time to establish a permanent, new all Irish Medical Service in 1922.

Medical career 
Thornton dedicated her life to both revolutionary activities and the medical sector; she was a practitioner, lecturer and researcher.  Her involvement as a doctor was not only hospital work, but also as a volunteer.  She was an avid educator of women on the importance of hygiene in the development of children and factors of disease that flourished in the impoverished slums of the inner city and surrounding suburbs.  This work was marginalised by the lack of funds for a public health service to help ordinary people.  Clean water was a commodity at this time and a strain of gastroenteritis was the cause of death of many babies. In her youth Thornton had expressed the passion to become a teacher but as women's role in society changed, society's constraints became less stringent, she could study medicine and pursue greater participation in this area.  This devotion and patriotism to her country established her name in history.  This involvement matched her commitment to revolution.

Lyons acquired a county scholarship to study an undergraduate degree in Medicine in University College Galway in 1917, where she graduated in 1922.  She also received a Postgraduate Diploma in public health from The National University of Ireland in 1927, known as University College Dublin (UCD).  In the 1950s when vaccines were developed and distributed to the general public, Thornton helped combat the Tuberculosis epidemic in Ireland and became involved in the pioneering of the BGG vaccination as she herself had been plagued by the illness alongside her husband Edward.  A team of fifteen members were dispersed throughout Ireland setting out to accomplish what would become a massive feat in medical history. She dedicated her life to working in the public sector; in a number of areas including the Kildare and Cork Boards of Health as a medical officer, and she was an assistant medical officer for the Dublin Health Authority.  Her other work titles included medical inspector at the Carnegie Centre in Dublin.

Later life
During her life, Thornton as in her youth was a passionate contributed to the welfare of the people. She was a librarian in the Rotunda Hospital, where she was an advisor to the new doctors and was always up to date on new medical practices which were necessary in an age of medical discovery. Thornton was heavily involved in the Medical Benevolent Fund. Thornton's retirement days were spent as a researcher in Trinity College Dublin.

Death 
Thornton lived a long life, surviving her husband Captain Edward Thornton who died in 1946, the couple had no children.  She had suffered ill health in her late seventies and retired, nevertheless, she continued to work as a volunteer in The Rotunda Maternity Hospital. Lyons died of cardiac-respiratory arrest, as stated on her death certificate, on 15 November 1987 at the age of 91.

Thornton was buried on the 71st anniversary of the Easter Rising in Toomore Cemetery, Foxford, County Mayo. Members of the Western Command rendered her military honours at her burial and her coffin was draped in the tricolour.

References

Bibliography
 Cowell, John, A Noontide Blazing: Brigid Lyons Thornton – Rebel, Soldier, Doctor (Dublin 2005)
 McCarthy, Cal, Cumann na mBan and the Irish Revolution (Dublin 2007)
 Mac Curtain, M and O'Corrain, D (eds.), Women in Irish Society (Dublin 1978)
 McCoole, Sinead, No Ordinary Women: Irish Female Activists in the Revolutionary Years 1900–1923 (Dublin 2003)
 McKillen, Beth, 'Irish Feminism and National Separatism, 1914–23', Eire-Ireland 17 (1982)

1896 births
1987 deaths
Irish public health doctors
National Army (Ireland) officers
Irish women medical doctors
People of the Easter Rising
Cumann na mBan members
Irish military doctors
Women public health doctors